Jonathan Davies may refer to:
Jonathan Davies (rugby, born 1962), Welsh dual-code rugby player and TV pundit
Jonathan Davies (rugby union, born 1988), Welsh rugby union player
Jonathan Davies (cricketer, born 1976), former English cricketer
Jonathan Davies (cricketer, born 1980), former Welsh cricketer
Jon Davies, American meteorologist and storm chaser
Jonathan Davies (English priest) (died 1809), Canon of Windsor and headmaster of Eton College
Jonathan Ceredig Davies (1859–1932), Welsh traveller and writer
Jonathan Davies (Welsh priest) (born 1969), Welsh Anglican priest
Jonathan Davies (athlete) (born 1994), English middle- and long-distance runner

See also
Jonathan Davis (disambiguation)
John Davies (disambiguation)
John Davis (disambiguation)